Kali Yuga Bizarre is the first full length studio album by the Italian industrial black metal band Aborym. It was released in 1999 on Scarlet records. A picture LP was also re-released in 2000 and was limited to 1000 copies.

Vocals on this album were performed by original vocalist Yorga SM as well as guest vocalist Attila Csihar.

Track listing

Personnel
Malfeitor Fabban – bass, keyboards, samples, synth, backing vocals
Yorga SM - Vocals
Attila Csihar – Vocals
Sethlans D.T.A. – guitars, samples
Nysrok Infernalien - guitars, additional vocals
Asmod Gvas XI Volgar dei Xacrestani - vocals on track 7, "declaration" on track 8

External links
Official page

Aborym at MySpace

Aborym albums
1999 debut albums
Scarlet Records albums